Northern Air Services Charters Limited is an airline operating both regularly scheduled flights and charter services from Nausori International Airport and other airports in Fiji. It took over some local routes no longer serviced by Pacific Sun, specifically to the Northern Division.

Northern Air introduced daily flights to Nadi from 1 April 2017 and were looking at buying ATR-42 series 300 aircraft.

Destinations
The airline serves the following domestic destinations in Fiji:
The airline also operates flights on behalf of the Fijian Navy

Fleet

Northern Air operates the following aircraft, as of November 2017:

References

External links
 Official website

Airlines of Fiji